The Bourgeois Tarot deck is a mid-19th century pattern of tarot cards of German origin that is still used for playing card games today in western Europe and Canada. It is not designed for divinatory purposes. This deck is most commonly found in France, Belgian Wallonia, Swiss Romandy and Canadian Québec for playing French Tarot; in southwest Germany for playing Cego and Dreierles; and in Denmark for Danish Tarok. 

The pattern is produced in two different designs today: the Black Forest pack used only in southwest Germany and the Tarot Nouveau used everywhere else, but especially in France. The International Playing-Card Society (IPCS) classifies both types as Bourgeois Tarot. The pattern is also called the Domestic Scenes pattern, but the name Bourgeois Tarot is preferred by the IPCS. Simon Wintle also refers to the original design by C.L. Wüst as the Encyclopedic Tarot.

Origin

The Bourgeois Tarot pattern originated around 1865 with C.L. Wüst, cardmakers in Frankfurt, Germany. The early edition, sometimes called the Encyclopaedic Tarot, lacked the corner indices on suit cards found on the later 20th century version published by French cardmakers such as Grimaud, but the values of trumps changed from Latin numerals common on older decks to Arabic numerals used in modern writing. These numerals were placed in the centre of the panels in a Fraktur font similar to cards which are now used for the German Tarock game of Cego. In the early 1900s, French cardmakers appropriated this pattern and would later add the corner indices to suit cards now found on other modern card decks. The numerals of the tarots were also repositioned to the four corners, while a maker's initial is often found in the centre of the panel. On some editions, however, the maker's initial occupies two of the corners.

Meanwhile German cardmakers continued to follow the original design: no corner indices on the suit cards and centrally placed numerals on the tarocks (tarots).

Cards 
The cards bear the French suits of spades, hearts, diamonds and clubs, rather than the Italian suits of swords, cups, coins and batons (typical in tarot decks used for cartomancy) or the traditional German suits of hearts, bells, acorns and leaves (commonly seen on Tarock and Schafkopf decks in East Germany, Austria and Hungary). The "pip" and court cards of the Bourgeois Tarot are similar in format to those of the traditional 52-card deck, with the addition of the knight face card.

The  or trumps vary in design. Those of the 78-card, Fournier type depict genre scenes of whimsical early 19th-century social activities of the well-to-do European bourgeoisie, hence the name, Bourgeois Tarot. In this design, the cards have corner indices; on older packs only at the top left/bottom right, with the manufacturer's initials at the top right/bottom left. Modern packs have four corner indices. 

By contrast, the tarocks of the 54-card, Black Forest Cego packs by F.X. Schmid used in southwest Germany for games such as Cego and Dreierles, have more rustic and rural scenes and the indices are placed at the top centre at both ends of the double-headed cards. 

Both corner indices and the reversible art of the courts and trumps facilitate the identification of cards when fanned in a player's hand.

Tarot Nouveau 
The largest manufacturers of the Tarot Nouveau pattern are Cartamundi and its subsidiaries, Ducale, Fournier and Grimaud; and Piatnik of Austria. They still produce the 78-card pack used for French Tarot and Danish Tarok; the trumps (tarots) depict typical nineteenth century French scenes of well-to-do bourgeoisie at home and in the town and country, with numerals in each corner.

Composition 

The Fournier type of Tarot Nouveau deck, like most (but not all) tarot decks, is composed of 78 cards. 56 are suited in the traditional French suits, with 14 cards per suit; ten "pip" cards with values 1 to 10 (the ace bears the number 1 instead of the familiar "A", and usually ranks low), and four court cards: jack, knight or cavalier ( or cavalier), queen and king. The other 22 are the 21  or trumps and one fool. The deck is thus primarily different from the standard 52-card deck in the existence of the separate trump "suit", and the addition of the knight as a court card. With these cards removed the deck is identical to the 52-card deck for playing purposes. The face cards do not use the Parisian pattern but have their own unique illustrations. The fool, though similar in appearance and function to the joker card of poker decks, has differing origins (see Joker for more information).

Trumps 
The 21 trumps in a Tarot Nouveau deck each have two scenes taking up the graphic portion of the card, in a roughly reversible fashion (one scene is always face-up), but unlike the court cards which have similar reversible art, most of the cards' scenes are not rotationally symmetrical. Each card has one scene show an "urban" representation of a particular trait or idea (listed below), while the other side depicts a more "rural" interpretation. These themes, instead of the historical and symbolic depictions, such as those used in the Tarot de Marseille, were chosen to represent tarot trumps in Unicode 7.0. The scenes depicted are tabulated below together with an interpretation of the seasons and themes represented by the French Tarot club of Orphin:

Black Forest Cego 

The second type of pack in current use is one produced by F.X. Schmid, which dates to the 19th century and follows more closely the Encyclopedic Tarot design of C.L. Wüst. It may have originally comprised 78 cards and been used for games such as Grosstarock, but it is only produced today in a shortened form used for the game of Cego. Cego is the national game of Baden and is played with two different patterns of pack: this one and an animal tarot pack known as Adler Cego. This variant of the Bourgeois Tarot depicts on its trump cards scenes of rural and town life based on woodcuts by Ludwig Richter. The same pack was produced by Bielefelder Spielkarten from 1955 to 1974 and the pattern was also manufactured by A.S.S. In the 1970s, this was the most common pattern used for playing Cego, but ASS have ceased mainstream production and their pack is only now (2022) obtainable from a couple of outlets.

Composition 
The pack is only known today in the 54-card version needed for the game of Cego. There are 32 French-suited cards with 8 cards per suit. There are four court cards as in the French Bourgeois Tarot pack, but only four pip cards per suit. In the black suits these are the 10, 9, 8 and 7, ranking in their normal order (10 high); in the red suits they are the Ace, 2, 3 and 4, rnaking in reverse order (Ace high). None of the cards bear index numbers. The Fool depicts a minstrel and the 22 trump cards (known as Trucks or Drucks) bear everyday rural and domestic scenes.

Notes

References

Literature 
 Dummett, Sir Michael and John McLeod (1975). "Cego" in The Journal of the Playing-Card Society, Vol. 4, No. 1, Aug 1975, pp. 30-46. ISSN 0305-2133.

External links

IPCS Pattern Sheet 18 - Bourgeois Tarot.
Subject matter of the trump pictures
 Wüst "Encyclopedic Tarot".
 Héron French tarot.
 Bourgeois Tarot by Piatnik 1987.
 Bourgeois Tarot by VASS.
 Encyclopedic Tarock by Wüst.

Tarot playing card decks
French tarot
Playing card patterns